Jorge Isaac Arvizu Martínez (July 23, 1932 – March 18, 2014), better known by the stage name Jorge Arvizu, was a Mexican actor and voice actor who was the first Spanish voice, among others, for the characters Bugs Bunny, Fred Flintstone and Cookie Monster. He was also nicknamed El Tata.

Arvizu died on March 18, 2014, in Mexico City, after suffering a heart failure.

Voice Roles
 Chef Skinner in Ratatouille (2007)
 Ramon in Cars (2006)
 Bert and Cookie Monster in Plaza Sésamo (1972-1990)
 Chief Garner in Dirty Pair Flash (1998–1999)
 The Narrator in Thomas and Friends (1984-1986)
 Mr. Papadopolous in Life of Brian (1979)
 Grandpa Joe Bucket in Willy Wonka & the Chocolate Factory (1971)
 Mercutio in Romeo and Juliet (1968)
 The Penguin in Batman (1968)
 Dr. Doom in Fantastic Four (1967–1968)
 George Harrison and Ringo Starr in The Beatles TV series (1965–1969) and Let It Be (1970)
 Robot in Lost in Space (1965–1968)
 Maxwell Smart in the Get Smart 1965 TV series, the 1995 revival and the 2008 film
 Quincy Magoo in The Famous Adventures of Mr. Magoo (1964-1965)
 Uncle Fester in The Addams Family (1964)
 Benny the Ball and Choo-Choo in Top Cat (1961–1962) and Top Cat: The Movie (2011)
 Fred Flintstone in The Flintstones (1960–1966)
 Pedro in Lady and the Tramp (1955)
 Bugs Bunny and Daffy Duck in the Looney Tunes and Merrie Melodies (1950–1961)
 Woody Woodpecker (1950–1961)
 Popeye in the Popeye cartoons (1933–1957)
 Felix the Cat

References

External links
 
 
 

1932 births
2014 deaths
Male actors from Guanajuato
Mexican people of Basque descent
Mexican male voice actors
20th-century Mexican male actors
21st-century Mexican male actors